is a Japanese football player.

Club statistics
Updated to 23 February 2020.

References

External links
Profile at Nagano Parceiro

1988 births
Living people
Kindai University alumni
Association football people from Wakayama Prefecture
Japanese footballers
J2 League players
J3 League players
Japan Football League players
Kataller Toyama players
AC Nagano Parceiro players
Association football defenders